Maksim Samchenko (born 5 May 1979) is a Kazakh football defender whose last known club was Spartak Semey. Samchenko has six caps with the Kazakhstan national football team.

He formerly played for FC Bolat, FC Vostok, FC Shakhter and FC Aktobe.

References

Profile at club website

1979 births
Living people
Kazakhstani footballers
Kazakhstan international footballers
Kazakhstan Premier League players
FC Shakhter Karagandy players
FC Aktobe players
FC Astana players
FC Vostok players
FC Zhetysu players
FC Spartak Semey players
FC Atyrau players
Association football defenders